Proto Motors was a South Korean sports car manufacturer and coachbuilder.

History 
Proto Motors was established in 1997 by the couple Han-chul Kim and Ji-sun Choi. The company has forged partnerships with Hyundai Motor Company, Kia Motors, and GM Daewoo. In 2001, the company custom-made a convertible limousine for Cheongwadae (the Equus), the South Korean presidential residence.

Proto Motors introduced the Spirra (a production model of PS-ll) at the 4th Seoul Motor Show. In 2006, Proto Motors was acquired by Oullim Motors and the development of the Spirra was continued, and in 2010 Proto Motors introduced the first Korea-made supercar. In 2014, the Oullim Motors Spirra EV, the electric version of the Spirra, was introduced.

Presently, the company specializes in redesigning existing models by developing electric cars or convertibles based on them. The company closed in 2017.

Models
 RT-X (1998)
 PS-II (2000)
 Spirra (2007–2017)
 Kia Grand Carnival Limousine (2006–2017)

See also

 List of Korean car makers

References 

Car manufacturers of South Korea
South Korean brands
Sports car manufacturers
Vehicle manufacturing companies established in 1997
Car brands
Luxury motor vehicle manufacturers
Contract vehicle manufacturers
Vehicle manufacturing companies disestablished in 2017